Brian Greer (born July 15, 1974, in Orillia, Ontario) is a Canadian professional ice hockey goaltender currently playing for the Odense Bulldogs in the top Danish ice hockey league, AL-Bank Ligaen.

Professional career
Following Greer's junior hockey with the Gloucester Rangers in the CJHL, he played two years with the Muskegon Fury of the Colonial Hockey League. Greer spent the next 6 seasons playing for the Bracknell Bees of the Ice Hockey Superleague (ISL) in the United Kingdom. The Bees were league champions in the 1999–2000 season.

Greer signed with SønderjyskE of the Danish AL-Bank Ligaen for the 2003–04 season and has played in Denmark since then. He has played for two championship teams in Denmark, in 2005–06 and in 2008–09; both SønderjyskE teams. Greer has also played for Aalborg in the Danish ice hockey league.

Awards
Named to the All-Star Team in the 1995 Centennial Cup
Shared the Bracknell Bees Players Player of the Year award with Joe Ferraccioli 1996–1997
Best Defenceman with the Bracknell Bees 1999–2000
Named to the 2nd ISL All-Star Team 1999–2000
Best Defenceman with the Bracknell Bees 2000–2001
Players Player of the Year with the Bracknell Bees 2000–2001
Voted Import Player of the Year with the Vojens Lions (SønderjyskE) 2003–2004
Named to the Danish All-Star Team for the Season 2003–2004
Voted Best Goaltender in Denmark 2003–2004
Named to the Danish All-Star Team for the Season 2005–2006

Records
On Jan 6, 2004 playing for SønderjyskE, Greer became the first professional ice hockey goaltender in Denmark to score a goal.

Footnotes

References
Eurohockey.net
EliteProspects.com
Ice Hockey Journalists UK
The Internet Hockey Database

External links

Brian Greer's Player Page at OdenseBulldogs.com
Brian Greer's Player Page at Oik.dk 

1974 births
AaB Ishockey players
Bracknell Bees players
Canadian ice hockey goaltenders
Ice hockey people from Ontario
Ice Hockey Superleague players
Living people
People from Orillia
Canadian expatriate ice hockey players in England
Canadian expatriate ice hockey players in Denmark